Altnabreac is a tiny settlement within the county of Caithness, in the north of Scotland, and now within the Highland council area. 

The name Altnabreac is from the Scots Gaelic Allt nam Breac, meaning "the stream of the trout".

The settlement, notable for its remoteness, consists of Altnabreac railway station and the former Altnabreac School. The school was closed in 1986 and converted into a private residence. The former gamekeeper's house sits adjacent to the school and station.

During the 1980s peat banks were worked to provide fuel for the residents who regularly used to be cut off from the nearest town of Thurso during the winter.

Altnabreac, like Dounreay, was considered as a location for a final repository for the UK's nuclear waste. This idea was not pursued.

References

External links
 

Populated places in Caithness